Emory University's Goizueta Business School (also known as Goizueta Business School, Emory Business School, or simply Goizueta – pronounced goy-swet-ah) is the private business school of Emory University located in Atlanta, Georgia, United States. It is named after Roberto C. Goizueta, former Chairman and CEO of The Coca-Cola Company.

History

On February 18, 1919, the dean of Emory College, Howard Odum, recommended the creation of a "school of economics and business administration" to the Board of Trustees. Thus, in the fall of 1919, the new school worked with Emory College to offer courses in economics, accounting, and business law. By 1925, there was one faculty member and full-time assistant, five staff members and 145 students. In 1926, eight students received the Bachelor of Business Administration degree. Two decades after the school awarded degrees in business administration, the school accepted its first female student in 1954. In the same year, the MBA program commenced, with 19 registered students.

In 1992, the Evening MBA program was introduced. When the American Association of Collegiate Schools of Business began accrediting master’s programs, Emory’s program was one of the first to be approved. Four years later, Emory appeared on the list of the top American colleges and universities producing U.S. executives. This newfound position accompanied new programs, such as the concentration within the MBA program for professional accounting and, in 1979, the Executive MBA program. Also at this time, the school created a plan to allow students to complete both the MBA and Juris Doctor degree within four years.

In 1994, the school was renamed for Roberto C. Goizueta, the CEO of The Coca-Cola Company. The millennium brought about a new PhD program in business administration and a new program in Real Estate. The school announced Karen Sedatole as interim dean in 2020.

Academics

Facilities

Main campus

Goizueta is located on the main campus of Emory University, located in the Druid Hills section of unincorporated DeKalb County, Georgia, a suburban community near Atlanta. Also located on the main campus are Emory College of Arts and Sciences and all graduate and professional schools, including the Law and Medical schools. Other key buildings on campus include the Dobbs University Center (DUC), the Woodruff PE Center (WOODPEC), and the Woodruff Library, which contains the Goizueta Business Library.

Main campus is about a 15-minute drive from downtown and midtown Atlanta as well as the Buckhead area.

The building at the corner of Fishburne Drive and Clifton Road was dedicated in October 1997. A significant part of the funding was made possible by the Woodruff Foundation and Emory Board of Trustees Chair Bradley Currey.

Goizueta Foundation Center

Completed in 2005, the 90,000 square foot Goizueta Foundation Center for Research and Doctoral Education houses areas for PhD students, Executive MBA classrooms, the MBA Career Management Center, and conference and breakout rooms. The Balser Art Collection, a collection of art including original works by Andy Warhol, Pablo Picasso and Salvador Dalí, is located throughout the center.

Notable faculty

 Benn Konsynski – George S. Craft Distinguished University Professor of Information Systems & Operations Management
 Jagdish Sheth – Charles H. Kellstadt Professor of Marketing

Notable alumni

 John Chidsey - CEO of Burger King
 Brian Gallagher - President and CEO of the United Way of America
 Michael Golden - Vice Chairman of The New York Times Company
 Lado Gurgenidze - Prime Minister of Georgia
 Tim Kelly - Mayor of Chattanooga, Tennessee
 Alan J. Lacy - Former Chairman and CEO of Sears, Roebuck and Company
 Jim Lanzone - CEO of CBS Interactive
 Duncan Niederauer - CEO of NYSE Euronext
 Michael J. Petrucelli - Founder and Executive Chairman, Clearpath, Inc.
 A.J. Steigman - Founder and CEO of Steignet

See also
 Emory Center for Alternative Investments
 List of United States business school rankings
 List of business schools in the United States

References

Business schools in Georgia (U.S. state)
Emory University colleges and schools
The Washington Campus
Educational institutions established in 1919
1919 establishments in Georgia (U.S. state)